Hannah Ewings is an Australian rules footballer for the Port Adelaide Football Club in the Australian Football League Women's competition.

References 

Port Adelaide Football Club (AFLW) players
Living people
Year of birth missing (living people)
Place of birth missing (living people)